The Amsterdam Declaration 2002 is a statement of the fundamental principles of modern Humanism passed unanimously by the General Assembly of Humanists International (HI) at the 50th anniversary World Humanist Congress in 2002. According to HI, the declaration "is the official statement of World Humanism."

It is officially supported by all member organisations of HI including:

Humanistic Association Netherlands (Humanistisch Verbond)
American Humanist Association
Humanists UK
Humanist Canada
Association humaniste du Québec
Human-Etisk Forbund, the Norwegian Humanist Association
Humanistischer Verband Deutschlands, the Humanist Association of Germany
Council of Australian Humanist Societies
Council for Secular Humanism
Gay and Lesbian Humanist Association
Humanist Association of Ireland
Indian Humanist Union
Sapiens Foundation, India
Philippine Atheists and Agnostics Society (PATAS)

A complete list of signatories can be found on the HI page (see references).

This declaration makes exclusive use of capitalized Humanist and Humanism, which is consistent with HI's general practice and recommendations for promoting a unified Humanist identity. To further promote Humanist identity, these words are also free of any adjectives, as recommended by prominent members of HI. Such usage is not universal among HI member organizations, though most of them do observe these conventions.

Humanist principles
(see References for complete text)

The official defining statement of World Humanism is:

Humanism is ethical. It affirms the worth, dignity and autonomy of the individual and the right of every human being to the greatest possible freedom compatible with the rights of others. Humanists have a duty of care to all humanity including future generations. Humanists believe that morality is an intrinsic part of human nature based on understanding and a concern for others, needing no external sanction. 
Humanism is rational. It seeks to use science creatively, not destructively. Humanists believe that the solutions to the world’s problems lie in human thought and action rather than divine intervention. Humanism advocates the application of the methods of science and free inquiry to the problems of human welfare. But Humanists also believe that the application of science and technology must be tempered by human values. Science gives us the means but human values must propose the ends.
Humanism supports democracy and human rights. Humanism aims at the fullest possible development of every human being. It holds that democracy and human development are matters of right. The principles of democracy and human rights can be applied to many human relationships and are not restricted to methods of government.
Humanism insists that personal liberty must be combined with social responsibility. Humanism ventures to build a world on the idea of the free person responsible to society, and recognizes our dependence and responsibility for the natural world. Humanism is undogmatic, imposing no creed upon its adherents. It is thus committed to education free from indoctrination. 
Humanism is a response to the widespread demand for an alternative to dogmatic religion. The world’s major religions claim to be based on revelations fixed for all time, and many seek to impose their world-view on all of humanity. Humanism recognizes that reliable knowledge of the world and ourselves arises through a continuing process of observation, evaluation and revision.
Humanism values artistic creativity and imagination and recognises the transforming power of art. Humanism affirms the importance of literature, music, and the visual and performing arts for personal development and fulfilment.
Humanism is a lifestance aiming at the maximum possible fulfilment through the cultivation of ethical and creative living and offers an ethical and rational means of addressing the challenges of our time. Humanism can be a way of life for everyone everywhere.

The Amsterdam Declaration explicitly states that Humanism rejects dogma, and imposes no creed upon its adherents.

History

At the first World Humanist Congress in the Netherlands in 1952, Humanists International (then: International Humanist and Ethical Union, IHEU) general assembly agreed a statement of the fundamental principles of modern Humanism – The Amsterdam Declaration. 

At the 50th anniversary World Humanist Congress in 2002, the IHEU general assembly unanimously passed a resolution updating that declaration – "The Amsterdam Declaration 2002".

References

External links
 Amsterdam Declaration 1952 - ratified by the first World Humanist Congress of the IHEU
 Amsterdam Declaration 2002 - ratified by unanimous resolution of the IHEU general assembly
 Amsterdam Declaration 2022 - ratified by the Humanist International (formerly IHEU) general assembly

Humanism
2002 essays
Humanist manifestos
Nontheism publications
2002 documents